Thaddeus (or Tadeos) was an Armenian bishop and friar. He was consecrated as the Armenian Apostolic bishop of Caffa by the Caucasian Albanian catholicos Stepanos IV in or before 1321. The papal bull Doctor gentium egregius of Pope John XXII, dated 22 November 1321, refers to him as "the son of perdition ... who separated from unity with the church." He opposed the sitting Latin bishop, Jerome of Catalonia. In 1322, however, he converted to Roman Catholicism and joined the Dominican Order. He may have been promised in exchange the right to succeed Jerome when the latter died. The question of the chronology of the Catholic bishops of Caffa in this period is somewhat confused.

Later in 1322, Thaddeus travelled with Jerome to Avignon to see the pope. He was still there in 1323. In a letter to King Leo II of Armenia dated 1323, Marino Sanudo Torsello writes that "Brother Thaddeus and his associates, your envoys, who are now at the Roman curia, will be able to report to you orally when they return to you" about how Sanudo was pleading for assistance to the Armenian kingdom. In 1328, Thaddeus was appointed Latin bishop of Corycus. In 1334, he succeeded Jerome as bishop of Caffa. He served until his death in 1357.

Thaddeus translated part of the Dominican Breviary into Armenian. Paul Riant, in editing the Ystoria de desolatione et conculcatione civitatis Acconensis et tocius terre sancte, a Latin account of the fall of Acre in 1291, proposed that its author, Thaddeus of Naples, was identical to Thaddeus of Caffa. This hypothesis is considered very unlikely.

Notes

References

Further reading
Loenertz, Raymond-Joseph. "Deux évêques dominicains de Caffa: frère Thaddée d'Arménie et frère Matthieu Manni de Cortone." Archivum Fratrum Praedicatorum 5 (1935): 346–357.
Richard, Jean. "Deux évêques dominicains agents de l'Union arménienne au Moyen-Âge." Archivum Fratrum Praedicatorum 19 (1949): 255–265.

1357 deaths
14th-century Armenian writers
Bishops of the Armenian Apostolic Church
Armenian Catholic bishops